Eroii Revoluției (English: Heroes of the Revolution) is a metro station in Bucharest, on Bucharest Metro Line M2. It was initially named Pieptănari, but the name was changed to commemorate those people who died during the Romanian Revolution of 1989. The station was opened on 24 January 1986 as part of the inaugural section of the line, from Piața Unirii to Depoul IMGB.

References

Bucharest Metro stations
Railway stations opened in 1986
1986 establishments in Romania